Gainesville-Hawthorne State Trail is a paved rail trail in Florida.

It passes through the Paynes Prairie Preserve State Park and the Lochloosa Wildlife Management Area along a former Atlantic Coast Line Railroad line. The property was purchased by the state of Florida from CSX Transportation with money from the "trails from rails" program in late 1989. The trail opened for use in January 1992.

History 
At the entrance of Witness Tree Junction, a trailhead along the Gainesville-Hawthorne State Trail, a trio of live oak trees sport carvings demanding notice of Colonel Daniel Newnan and his 100 soldiers' march to capture runaway Black Seminoles during the Patriot War of 1812. These three trees are also marked by N.R. Gruelle, a surveyor for the Florida Southern Railway (originally the Gainesville, Ocala and Charlotte Harbor Railroad Company), to delineate one end of railroad property.

Recreational activities
Activities include hiking, running, cycling, rollerblading, and horseback riding. A grassy equestrian pathway is available except east of the Lochloosa trailhead.

Hours and Locations
The Boulware Springs trailhead is located at Boulware Springs Nature Park, 3300 S.E. 15th St, Gainesville, and is open from 8 a.m. to 6 p.m. November through April and from 8 a.m. to 8 p.m. May through October.

Other trailheads with parking include (1) intersection of county roads 234 and 2082, Rochelle (at Prairie Creek Preserve); (2) 7902 S.E. 200th Drive, off County Road 2082, west of Hawthorne; and (3) 2182 S.E. 71st Avenue, Hawthorne.

The Paynes Prairie portion of the trail is open from 8 a.m. until sunset, 365 days a year.

See also

Florida State Parks in Alachua County
Old Gainesville Depot
Paynes Prairie Preserve State Park
Boulware Springs Nature Park

References

External links
 Gainesville-Hawthorne State Trail at Florida State Parks
 Friends of the Gainesville-Hawthorne Trail
 Gainesville-Hawthorne State Trail at Absolutely Florida
 Gainesville-Hawthorne State Trail at Wildernet
 Area Overview of Gainesville-Hawthorne Rail Trail at Outdoor Travels
 Gainesville-Hawthorne State Trail at 100 Florida Trails

State parks of Florida
Parks in Alachua County, Florida
Rail trails in Florida
Former CSX Transportation lines
Bike paths in Florida
1989 establishments in Florida